The Folio Society is a London-based publisher, founded by Charles Ede in 1947 and incorporated in 1971. Formerly privately owned, it operates as an employee ownership trust since 2021.

It produces illustrated hardback editions of classic fiction and non-fiction books, poetry and children's titles. Folio editions feature specially designed bindings and include artist-commissioned illustrations (most often in fiction titles) or researched artworks and photographs (in non-fiction titles). Most editions come with their own slipcase.

For many years the Folio Society had a bookshop in Holborn, London, but the bookshop closed in December 2016 when the company moved premises. Folio editions can be purchased only online through their website, by post or over the telephone. Some editions used to be stocked by independent bookstores, by Blackwell's in Oxford, and by Selfridges, Harrods and Hatchards in London.

History
The Folio Society was founded in 1947 by Charles Ede, Christopher Sandford (of Golden Cockerel Press), and Alan Bott (founder of Pan Books). The firm's goal was to produce "editions of the world's great literature, in a format worthy of the contents, at a price within the reach of everyman." Folio and the Golden Cockerel Press shared premises in Poland Street until 1955. Subsequent offices were located in the Mayfair and Borough areas of London, such as 70 Brook Street in the late 1950s.  The Folio Society moved to its location in 44 Eagle Street, Holborn, in 1994 – in 2017, their offices moved to 4 Maguire Street, London.

The society issued its first three titles in 1947. In October of that year Tolstoy's Tales went on sale for sixteen shillings (this would have been about US$3 in 1947, or just over US$33 in 2018.) Tales was followed in November and December by George du Maurier's Trilby and a translation of Aucassin et Nicolette, establishing a pattern of monthly publication.

In 1971 The Folio Society was incorporated and purchased by John Letts and Halfdan Lynner. Under their ownership, The Folio Society published the collected novels of Dickens, Trollope, Hardy, Elizabeth Gaskell and Conrad.

Lord Gavron was owner and chairman of The Folio Society from 1982 until his death in 2015.

Membership and non-member sales

At its inception, The Folio Society operated as a membership-based book club; as the list of titles grew, the membership commitment was established as four books per year. Since 2011, anyone has been able to purchase from the Folio Society list without committing to membership. On 1 September 2016, the company ended its membership-based structure.

In 2021, The Folio Society started operating as an employee ownership trust.

Production trends and bindings

The company currently publishes more than 60 titles a year, including multi-volume sets.  Most titles are digitally typeset, then printed by offset at printers in the United Kingdom, Germany, Italy, and Spain.  Until 1954, most Folio books were issued with printed dust jackets, but during the latter half of the 1950s coloured card slip cases were introduced, to protect the books and retain focus on the decorative bindings. Solander boxes are generally used to protect the limited editions.

Folio publications are printed in a range of standard sizes (in 1951, for example, these included Royal Octavo, Medium Octavo, Crown Octavo and Demy Octavo), and custom sizes are also employed.  The most common material for bindings is buckram or a similar bookcloth, but there are many exceptions:  aluminium foil was used in binding Aldous Huxley's Brave New World in 1971, and vegetable parchment in binding Voltaire's The Calas Affair in 1994; more commonly, marbled papers (often produced by Ann Muir Marbling Ltd.) have been used for several volumes in recent years, either as endpapers or as board-papers of quarter bindings; moiré silk (usually artificial) has been used sporadically over the years as a binding material, and leather (vellum and goatskin) and bonded leather are sometimes used, chiefly for the more expensive editions.  Most bindings for works of fiction are designed by the illustrator.  Non-fiction binding designers include David Eccles, Jeff Clements, and Neil Gower.

Beginning in 2007, the company used traditional letterpress printing (the method which Johannes Gutenberg devised in the middle of the fifteenth century) to publish each of Shakespeare's plays, as well as the Sonnets and Poems, in large-format editions. This landmark project of 39 volumes was finally completed in 2014.

Illustrators
Notable among the hundreds of illustrators of Folio books are:
 Edward Ardizzone (R L Stevenson, Travels with a Donkey)
 Quentin Blake (Voltaire, Candide; George Orwell, Animal Farm)
 Harry Brockway (S T Coleridge, The Rime of the Ancient Mariner) 
 John Lawrence (Laurence Sterne, Tristram Shandy; T H White, The Once and Future King)
 Beryl Cook (Christopher Isherwood, Mr Norris Changes Trains; Muriel Spark, The Prime of Miss Jean Brodie)
 Anthony Colbert (Jane Eyre) 
 Geoff Grandfield (novels and stories of Raymond Chandler) 
 Sam Weber (William Golding, Lord of the Flies; Gene Wolfe, The Book of the New Sun; Frank Herbert, Dune)
 Margrethe II of Denmark (as Ingahild Grathmer) (J.R.R. Tolkien, The Lord of the Rings)
 Dave McKean (Gormenghast)
Fine artists who have illustrated books for the Society include:
 Elisabeth Frink (Horace Odes)
 Paul Cox (works by P G Wodehouse)
 Jean Hugo (1950 edition of Romeo and Juliet)
 Charles Keeping (complete novels of Charles Dickens)
 Francis Mosley (complete Joseph Conrad)
 Charles van Sandwyk (Kenneth Grahame, The Wind in the Willows; Lewis Carroll, Alice in Wonderland)
 Neil Packer (Umberto Eco, The Name of the Rose; Joseph Heller, Catch-22)
 Tom Phillips (Samuel Beckett, Waiting for Godot; T. S. Eliot, The Waste Land)
Prominent wood engravers include:
 Simon Brett (poems by Keats, Shelley and Byron)
 Peter Forster (Canterbury Tales by Chaucer, novels of George Eliot, plays and sonnets of Shakespeare and selected works by Oscar Wilde)
 Peter Reddick (complete novels and stories of Thomas Hardy)
 Paula Rego (English nursery rhymes compilation and J M Barrie, Peter Pan and Wendy)
Some recent commissions are from:
 A Richard Allen (Kingsley Amis, Lucky Jim)
 Elena and Anna Balbusso (Pushkin, Eugene Onegin)
 James Boswell (J G Ballard, The Drowned World; Margery Allingham, Traitor's Purse)
 Jonathan Burton (Douglas Adams, The Hitchhiker's Guide to the Galaxy; George Orwell, Nineteen Eighty-Four)
 Fay Dalton (Ian Fleming, Casino Royale, From Russia, with Love)
 Jeff Fisher (Lewis Carroll, The Hunting of the Snark)
 Stephen Hickman (Robert Heinlein, Starship Troopers)
 David Hughes (Ken Kesey, One Flew Over the Cuckoo's Nest; Mark Twain, A Connecticut Yankee in King Arthur's Court)
 Federico Infante (Vladimir Nabokov, Lolita)
 Igor Karash (Leo Tolstoy, War and Peace; Angela Carter, The Bloody Chamber and Other Stories)
 John Vernon Lord (James Joyce, Finnegans Wake) 
 Shotopop (Philip K Dick, The Man in the High Castle)
 Jillian Tamaki (Christina Rossetti, Goblin Market)
 Joe Wilson (Arthur C Clarke, 2001: A Space Odyssey)

See also
Easton Press
Franklin Library
A History of England
Golden Cockerel Press

References and sources
References

Sources
 Cave, Roderick & Sarah Mason, A History of the Golden Cockerel Press, 1920–1960 (2002. British Library & Oak Knoll Press)
 Nash, Paul W., Folio 50: a bibliography of the Folio Society, 1947–1996 (1997. Folio Press in association with The British Library)
 Nash, Paul W. Folio 60: a bibliography of the Folio Society, 1947–2006 (2007. Folio Society) (Includes essays by Sue Bradbury, Joseph Connolly and David McKitterick)
 Nash, Paul W., 'Folio fine editions', in Parenthesis (4 April 2000), pp. 22–24. (Includes a checklist of 'Fine editions', giving print-runs)

External links
 
 

Book publishing companies of the United Kingdom
Publishing companies established in 1947
Book clubs
1947 establishments in England